West Point Township may refer to the following townships in the United States:

 West Point Township, Stephenson County, Illinois
 West Point Township, White County, Indiana
 West Point Township, Butler County, Iowa
 West Point Township, Lee County, Iowa
 West Point Township, Bates County, Missouri

And one in Liberia:

 West Point, Monrovia